James Kirkham was a footballer who played one game in the Football League for Burslem Port Vale in September 1895.

Career
Kirkham joined Football League Second Division side Burslem Port Vale in August 1895. He made only one appearance, in a 2–1 defeat at Burton Wanderers on 21 September 1895 before being released from the Athletic Ground at the end of the season.

Career statistics
Source:

References

Year of birth missing
Year of death missing
English footballers
Association football wingers
Port Vale F.C. players
English Football League players